Air Nigeria (formerly Nigerian Eagle Airlines and Virgin Nigeria Airways), was the national flag carrier of Nigeria. The airline operates scheduled regional and domestic passenger services. Its base is Murtala Mohammed International Airport, Lagos. The airline is a replacement for defunct Nigeria Airways. Its registered office is in Ikoyi, Lagos State, while its head office is on the 9th floor of Etiebets Place in Ikeja, Lagos State. serves the following destinations (at June 2010):

On 28 September 2004, the Nigerian government and Virgin Group signed an agreement to establish a new airline for Nigeria, to be called Virgin Nigeria Airways. Nigerian institutional investors own 51% of the company and Virgin Atlantic Airways owns 49%. The airline's inaugural flight was on 28 June 2005 from Lagos to London Heathrow using an Airbus A340-300 aircraft.

On 19 August 2008, Virgin Atlantic announced that it was "in talks to sell its 49 percent stake in Virgin Nigeria". It is also reviewing "whether it is appropriate that the Virgin brand should remain linked to Virgin Nigeria". The dispute arose after Virgin Nigeria's domestic operations were moved against its will by the Ministry of Transportation to Terminal 2.

On 17 September 2009, Virgin Nigeria announced on their website they had rebranded as Nigerian Eagle Airlines. Nigerian Eagle Airlines also stated that they plan to focus on domestic and regional flights with further expansion into Europe and eventually the United States of America. Virgin still own 49% of the new Nigerian Eagle Airlines with the remaining 51% by Nigerian investors.

On 2 June 2010, following the acquisition of a majority share in the airline, Jimoh Ibrahim, the new chairman, announced that Nigerian Eagle Airlines had changed its name to Air Nigeria Development Limited and would be known as Air Nigeria.

In December 2011, Air Nigeria maintained services to the following domestic and regional destinations:

External links
Domestic & Regional Destinations of Air Nigeria

References

Lists of airline destinations